Tanaji Sawant is a businessman, Balasahebanchi Shiv Sena politician and deputy leader from Solapur district, Maharashtra. 
He is current Member of Legislative Assembly from Bhoom / Paranda Vidhan Sabha constituency as a member of Shiv Sena.
He was elected to legislative council with a record margin of 270 votes, securing 348 votes.

He came into prominence for his Water conservation project, part of Shiv Sena’s ‘Shiv Jal Kranti’ scheme in Osmanabad district in May 2016.

Positions held
 2016: Deputy Leader, Shiv Sena
 2016: Elected to Maharashtra Legislative Council
 2017: Appointed Shiv Sena Sampark Pramukh Osmanabad and Solapur District
 2019: Minister of Water Conservation in Maharashtra State Government
 2019: Elected to Maharashtra Legislative Assembly
 2022: Took oath as Cabinet Minister.

References

External links
  Shivsena Home Page 

Living people
Shiv Sena politicians
People from Osmanabad district
Members of the Maharashtra Legislative Council
Marathi politicians
Year of birth missing (living people)